Cozieni is a commune in Buzău County, Muntenia, Romania. It is composed of twenty villages: Anini, Bălănești, Bercești, Ciocănești, Cocârleni, Colțeni, Cozieni, Fața lui Nan, Gloduri, Izvoru, Lungești, Nistorești, Pietraru, Punga, Teiș, Trestia, Tulburea, Valea Banului, Valea Roatei and Zăpodia.

Notes

Communes in Buzău County
Localities in Muntenia